Lac de Bage is a lake in Aveyron, France. At an elevation of 715 m, its surface area is 0.53 km².

Bage